Marijan Jantoljak (born 7 February 1940) is a former Croatian football player.

Playing career

Club
Born in Zagreb, he started playing in a local club NK Ponikve.  In his early career he also played with FK Radnički Nova Pazova from where, in summer 1958, he joined FK Jedinstvo Zemun. In the season 1959–60 he joined Rijeka and stayed in the club until 1972. That year he moved to FK Borac Banja Luka and played another 5 seasons there. By the end of his career he played with Yugoslav Second League sides Metalac Sisak and HNK Segesta.

As a player, he was the most capped goalkeeper of all time for HNK Rijeka. He also scored 15 goals during his time in Rijeka as he was a regular penalty kick taker. During the 1969–70 season, he did not concede a goal for 917 minutes, a record for any Rijeka goalkeeper.

International
Jantoljak made his debut for Yugoslavia in an October 1966 friendly match away against Israel, coming on as a 66th-minute substitute for Ilija Pantelić, and earned a total of 2 caps scoring no goals. His second and final international was a November 1966 friendly away against Bulgaria.

Managerial career
After retiring green at the age of 39, Jantoljak became a coach. Among other clubs, he has managed HNK Rijeka during the 1991–92 and 1995 seasons.

References

External links
 

1940 births
Living people
Footballers from Zagreb
Association football goalkeepers
Yugoslav footballers
Yugoslavia international footballers
FK Zemun players
HNK Rijeka players
FK Borac Banja Luka players
HNK Segesta players
Yugoslav First League players
Croatian football managers
HNK Segesta managers
NK Karlovac managers
HNK Rijeka managers
NK Inter Zaprešić managers
FC Koper managers
HNK Orijent managers
Croatian expatriate football managers
Expatriate football managers in Slovenia
Croatian expatriate sportspeople in Slovenia
HNK Rijeka non-playing staff